The Lawrenceburg Distillers were a minor league baseball team were based in Lawrenceburg, Kentucky. In 1908, the Distillers played as members of the Class D level Blue Grass League. The Distillers finished in 4th place in the 1908 standings, hosting home games at St. Charles Park.

History

In 1908, the "Lawrenceburg Distillers" became charter members of the Class D level Blue Grass League and began play on May 22, 1908. Joining Lawrenceburg as charter members in the six–team league were the Frankfort Lawmakers, Lexington Colts, Richmond Pioneers, Shelbyville Millers and Versailles Aristocrats, beginning league play on May 22, 1908.

The "Distillers" moniker references local industry. Lawrenceburg has been the home to the Old Hickory Distillery since 1891, makers of Wild Turkey bourbon.

The Distillers ended the 1908 regular season in 4th place with a record of 33–35, playing under manager Guy Woodruff and finishing 13.0 games out of 1st place.

The Blue Grass League had no playoffs and the 1st place Frankfort Statesmen (47–23) finished 9.0 games ahead of the 2nd place Lexington Colts (37–31) in the six–team league. They were followed by the Richmond Pioneers (36–34), Lawrenceburg (33–35), Shelbyville Millers (32–37) and Versailles Aristocrats/Winchester Reds (22–47).

Lawrenceburg, Kentucky did not field a team in the 1909 Blue Grass league, replaced by the Paris Bourbonites. Lawrenceburg has not hosted another minor league team.

The ballpark
The Lawrenceburg Distillers hosted 1908 minor league home games at St. Charles Park.

Year–by–year record

Notable alumni

Rudy Sommers (1908)
George Yantz (1908)

See also
Lawrenceburg (minor league baseball) players

References

External links
 Baseball Reference

Defunct baseball teams in Kentucky
Blue Grass League teams
Baseball teams established in 1908
Baseball teams disestablished in 1908
Anderson County, Kentucky